Ivan Sergei Gaudio (born May 7, 1971) is an American actor known for his work in television. His best known roles are Dr. Peter Winslow in Crossing Jordan and Henry Mitchell in Charmed.

Life
Ivan Sergei Gaudio was born in Hawthorne, New Jersey, and is of Dutch and Italian descent. He attended Hawthorne High School, where he was a member of the graduating class of 1989, and was a quarterback on the Hawthorne Cubs football team.

Career

Sergei first became known when he starred in John Woo's 1996 film Once a Thief, and then returned along with the rest of the cast for the 1997 television series, which only lasted one season. He next starred alongside Amanda Peet in the series Jack & Jill which ran from 1999 to 2001, and after this he joined the cast of the abruptly cancelled Wednesday 9:30 (8:30 Central) (2002). From 2003 to 2004, he starred on Crossing Jordan, and then in 2004 was part of the cast of Hawaii.

Sergei has also had roles in If Someone Had Known (1995), Dangerous Minds (1995), Mother, May I Sleep with Danger? (1996), The Opposite of Sex (1998), Scorched (2003), and 10.5 (2004). He has guest starred on Touched by an Angel, Cybill and Party of Five. In 2005 and 2006, he starred in Charmed as Henry Mitchell, the boyfriend and later husband of the character Paige Matthews. He also had a minor role in The Break-Up with Jennifer Aniston and Vince Vaughn. 

He co-starred with Jenny McCarthy in Santa Baby. He guest-starred in the October 2008 CSI: Miami episode "Raging Cannibal". Sergei played the lead character in the TV mini-series Jack Hunter and the Lost Treasure of Ugarit (2008). In 2009, he appeared in the Lifetime Nora Roberts adaptation High Noon, and had a guest role in episode 3 of Warehouse 13 with his Jack Hunter co-star Joanne Kelly.

Filmography

Film

Television

Other works
 2002 – Rebellion (Director/Writer)

References

External links

1971 births
Living people
American male film actors
American male television actors
American people of Dutch descent
American people of Italian descent
Male actors from New Jersey
People from Hawthorne, New Jersey
20th-century American male actors
21st-century American male actors